Leeza is an NBC and  syndicated daytime television talk show. It premiered on June 14, 1993 as John & Leeza from Hollywood, hosted by John Tesh and Leeza Gibbons.  Tesh left the show after seven months, and on January 17, 1994, the program was retitled Leeza, and Gibbons became the sole host remaining in that capacity throughout the remainder of its run. The show aired its final episodes on September 8, 2000.

The original format centered on celebrity news and interviews, but once Tesh left the show, it became more of a traditional television talk show.

The show ran on NBC between 1993 and 1999, showing on other stations in markets where the local NBC affiliate pre-empted it in favor of other programming. On April 14, 1999, NBC announced major changes to its daytime schedule; Leeza was dropped by the network to make room for Later Today. The show aired its final episode on NBC on September 3, 1999, after which it continued for one additional season in syndication. In early 2000, Leeza was cancelled after eight seasons due to low ratings; the final episode aired in May of that year. Reruns of the show continued to air until September 8, 2000. It was taped at Paramount Studios on Melrose Avenue in Hollywood, California, and was produced by Gibbons' production company and Paramount Television.

Gibbons was also a hands-on executive producer in addition to host of the show, involved in every aspect from selecting show topics to finding guests.

Recurring topics discussed on the show included current events of the time, mainly crime and celebrity stories. Famous con man Steve Comisar appeared on Leeza as a fraud prevention expert, under the name Brett Champion.

Leeza received 27 Daytime Emmy Award nominations (including nominations for Outstanding Host and Best Show for every year the show has been on the air) and has won three Emmy awards. The show also received a Genesis Award for programs that revealed animal abuse, the Media Access Award for accurately portraying persons with disabilities and an award from the Alzheimer's Association for show programming.

Leezas time slot often varied, as some stations aired the show in the morning while others aired it in the late-afternoon.

The program was also shown in the United Kingdom, as part of the original daytime schedule on Channel 5.

References

External links
 

1993 American television series debuts
2000 American television series endings
1990s American television talk shows
2000s American television talk shows
First-run syndicated television programs in the United States
Television series by CBS Studios
NBC original programming